The German School of Budapest - Thomas Mann Gymnasium (commonly referred to as DSB)  (German: Deutsche Schule Budapest - Thomas Mann Gymnasium) is a private international school in Budapest, Hungary. It was founded in 1908 to serve German families in Hungary. It now has a diverse student body with primarily children of the expatriate business and diplomatic communities. Considered to be one of the best schools of its kind, it was awarded a Certificate of Excellence by the Central Agency for German Schools Abroad in 2012 and again in 2020.

History 

The former Deutsche Schule Budapest was re-established as the continuation of, first, the 1908 Reichsdeutsche Schule Budapest, and later, the German Government School in Budapest. Its founders were the state of Baden-Württemberg, the Federal Government of Germany, the City of Budapest and the Hungarian Government, in succession to a tradition of German schools in Hungary dating back to the late 19th century. Since then, it has evolved into a prestigious institution for about 500 students, with a Primary School from Grade 1 to 4 (Grundschule) and a Secondary School for Grades 5 to 12 (Gymnasium).

Academics 

The German School of Budapest's philosophy is to serve as a platform fostering intercultural dialogue. It is committed to act as a bridge between the German and Hungarian society, culture and language.

It has a rigorous bicultural academic curriculum evidenced by a graduation rate of virtually 100% and one of the highest university admission rates (95%) in the country. The primary language of instruction is German with some classes taught in Hungarian, depending on the student's academic program. Given the limited German knowledge of the majority of the Hungarian pupils, teaching is more and more moving into bilingual set-up. Given the multicultural student body, the emphasis is on nurturing independent thinking, tolerance and openness.

The primary school encompasses Grades 1 to 4 and follows the national curriculum of Germany. Hungarian is offered as a regular language class for beginners, advanced and bilingual students. English is playfully introduced as a foreign language.

The secondary school is split into a German and Hungarian section. The German section follows the German national curriculum for Gymnasiums with English (Grade 5), French (Grade 6) and Spanish (Grade 9) as the foreign languages and leads to the German Abitur. Students in the Hungarian section also follow the German national curriculum but have additional classes in Hungarian literature, Hungarian history and are taught biology and chemistry in Hungarian according to the Hungarian national curriculum. In Grade 5 the focus is on acquiring proficiency in German. Students may sit the German Abitur, as well as the Hungarian Érettségi. The two sections are physically divided into separate classes up to Grade 9. After that, students of both sections are mixed so that Germans and Hungarians spend the majority of their time studying side by side.

The school is especially known for its high level in mathematics, science and languages. Students frequently outperform their counterparts in standardized tests, successfully participate in international and national academic competitions, and have the possibility to earn language certificates due to cooperation with the Institut Français and the Instituto Cervantes.

Faculty 
Teachers at the school are generally recommended and appointed by the German Ministry for Education (Kultusministerkonferenz) and have to be confirmed by the school. The positions are highly competitive and are based on three-year contracts with the possibility of extension. In some cases, especially for subjects taught in Hungarian, the school hires teachers directly from Hungary. Several years of experience at a highly reputable Hungarian secondary school is a minimum requirement.

Tuition 
Tuition for the 2016-2017 school year is 1,162,500 HUF excluding additional fees for registration, materials, extracurriculars, lunch, class trips, excursions, and transportation. This makes the DSB one of the most expensive private schools in the country.

Student body 
The school prides itself on its diversity, serving students from a wide range of cultural, ethnic and racial backgrounds. Albeit smaller than most other international schools in Budapest, it is proportionally more diverse and more focused on a cosmopolitan education with especially Grades 9-12 serving as examples of cross-cultural communication and understanding.

The German School is considered to be the go-to institution for an increasing number of diplomat, expat and bilingual families, as well as the Hungarian elite. Due to the high tuition fees and rigorous admission process, it primarily caters to an exclusive group of families.

Facilities 
The school has a large 35-hectare campus in the Buda hills overlooking the city and is conveniently accessible by public transport. A historic hunting lodge houses the primary school and the cafeteria. The secondary school and the administrative offices are located in a contemporary, purpose-built building. Apart from several specialty classrooms for the art and science classes, there is a computer room, a library with over 7,000 books, a gym and a professionally equipped theater. The outdoor facilities include a playground, a basketball and a soccer court, and a running track. All classrooms are equipped with Smart Boards.

For class trips, project excursions and training camps the school owns a holiday house in Gárdony, at the shore of Lake Velence. It can accommodate up to 36 people in en-suite rooms, has a fully equipped kitchen, a multipurpose room, and plenty of canoes and other sports equipment.

Due to increasing number of students, a major expansion project designed by BH Architects has started in August 2016. Apart from a new building amendment which will house new classrooms, an additional gym, a larger cafeteria. The new two-decked parking lot has already been completed.

Extracurriculars 

Each year the school offers a wide variety of extracurricular activities: from intramurals and club sports to arts, music and science. The drama and musical clubs put on plays suitable for different ages. In the past, famous Broadway productions such as Hair and Cats, as well as student-written pieces have been showcased. The Lego Robotics club has participated in national and international competitions. The DSB is one of currently nine Hungarian schools running the Model European Parliament project. Students have successfully advanced to the national and international rounds. The Class of '05 won the first prize at the German Competition of Political Education in 2003, and the school had regularly sends the finalists to the prestigious OKTV competition. The school has close links to the prestigious Europa-Kolleg, a two-weeks research scholarship program for annually twenty high school student, organised by the state foundation of Lower Saxony, the Stiftung Niedersachsen.

Athletics 

Following the concept of a holistic education, the school emphasises the importance of athletics. Students participate in varsity sports competing in tournaments with local Hungarian schools. The basketball team has also had notable successes, not the least thanks to the annual student-teacher match on the last school day before Christmas break.
The girls' volleyball team is one of the excelling school teams in the area, represented in almost every major high school level tournament. Club sports, such as hockey, four square (known as Tengo at the school)  and dance are particularly popular with the lower grades.

Traditions

Gombocz-Runde 

Named after one-time school coach and PE teacher Gábor Gombocz, the Gombocz-Runde is a 1,5 km cross country run on an area near the school with extreme inclines and uphill parts. As such, it is strenuous exercise even for generally fit students. Tradition has it that every student has to run it at least once a term to pass in PE, although this has recently been abandoned. The run itself nevertheless remains part of the PE curriculum. It is partly due to the tradition of the Gombocz-Runde that DSBlers are regularly seen at various city marathons and charity runs. Gombocz doesn't run with the students, he sits on a chair at the gate.

Adventsbasar 

The Adventsbasar is co-organised by the Parents' Association that takes place in early December. It is a Christmas-themed event where most classes get a stall and sell pancakes, mulled wine, and various trinkets. The profit usually goes to the class accounts of the pupils.

Szalagavató 

Once seniors have passed their first semester of finals and are admitted to the leaving examinations, they are allowed to wear a distinctive bright-blue ribbon on their coats. The Szalagavató is the ceremony when the ribbons are officially handed over to the students. The Szalagavató takes place in late November or early December marking the final stage of a student's school career. It is a white tie event taking place in the school, commonly presided over by the German Ambassador to Budapest or another high-ranking state officer and attended by the students´ families, friends, diplomats and corporate leadership.

Ballagás (graduation ceremony) 

Ballagás is the actual Graduation ceremony, on the last day of ordinary school schedules for the seniors. It takes place on the last Friday before the start of the preparatory and examination period, at the end of which the oral parts of the leaving examinations are taken. Seniors walk through classrooms decorated with flowers for this purpose, singing traditional commercium songs, such as Gaudeamus Igitur.

Notable alumni 

 Franz Reichelt, an inventor most notable for jumping to his death off of the Eiffel Tower with a self-made parachute
 Eva Szekely, gold medalist at the 1952 Summer Olympics in Helsinki
 Sara Cholnoky, olympic windsurfer competing in RS:X Class at the 2016 Summer Olympics in Rio de Janeiro

See also 
 Germans of Hungary
 Germany–Hungary relations

Notes

External links
 Website of the DSB

Private schools in Hungary
Schools in Budapest
German international schools in Europe
Gymnasiums in Hungary
Educational institutions established in 1908
1908 establishments in Hungary